Nasrabad (also Romanized as Naşrābād) is a village in Mohammadabad Rural District, in the Central District of Anbarabad County, Kerman Province, Iran. At the 2006 census, its population was 13, in 4 families.

References 

Populated places in Anbarabad County